Atala T (founded in 2002 as Everway Inc) is a web portal and internet service provider .

History
Atala T was founded as Everway Inc by Eddie Mack and Sarah W. Mack on June 4, 2002. Everway became one of the smallest ISP's on the net with only subscribers in the low thousands. On April 30, 2002, Everway Launched its fully own ISP service and IM service called Everway Online and EIM (Everway Instant Messenger). Everway Online provided Dial-up and DSL services at lower prices than CompuServe and AOL. In order to provide this service, Everway teamed up with AffinityPath LLC, which is now Barracuda Networks.

Death and re-birth
On May 5, 2005 Everway experienced a worldwide service interruption. The cause of the interruption was one of the main Affinity Path servers crashing and it caused hundreds of people to be left without dial-up service, however DSL services and IM services were not affected. This led to Everway building a temporary Dial-up server until normal service was restored. Everway never recovered from the incident and with Affinity Path nowhere in sight, was forced to shut down its Internet service department. Thousands of customers were outraged and were furious that Everway decided to kill its Internet service department. This was the result that killed Everway because the Internet department was the backbone of the company. Hundreds of jobs were lost but most people ended up in customer support. Everway gave each and every one of their subscribers their money back and the situation ended peacefully. On December 28, 2006, Sarah W. Mack (the majority partner in Everway) acquired the original Everway Inc. and rebranded it as "New Atala T Internet Services Limited." Everway Inc. became wholly owned by Atala T as a result of the acquisition. After the acquisition by Sarah W. Mack, Everway was renamed Atala T Internet Services on February 8, 2007. Soon after the acquisition, Sarah W. Mack took over as the CEO of the new company and re-built it from the ground up. Currently Atala T has over 35,000 subscribers. On August 1, 2009, CEO Sarah W. Mack decided to pull the plug on the Atala T brand of Internet Services.

Current services and products

 Atala T.B.S Version 9.0
 Atala T Mail
 Atala T T.B.S. For Mac

References

External links
 Atala T Corporate Site
 Affinity Path Information
 Atala T T.B.S
 Internet Has Changed The World

Technology companies established in 2002
Internet service providers of the United States
2002 establishments in New York City